The 1958 Basque Pelota World Championships were the 3rd edition of the Basque Pelota World Championships organized by  the FIPV.

Participating nations

Others

Events
A total of 17 events were disputed, in 5 playing areas.

Trinquete, 5 events disputed

Fronton (30 m), 2 events disputed

Fronton (36 m), 5 events disputed

Fronton (54 m), 2 events disputed

Plaza Libre, 3 events disputed

Medal table

References

World Championships,1958
World Championships
1958 in sports
Sport in Biarritz
1958 in French sport
September 1958 sports events in Europe
International sports competitions hosted by France
World Championships,1958